Schistocerca is a genus of grasshoppers, commonly called bird grasshoppers, many of which swarm as locusts. The best known species is probably the desert locust (S. gregaria) and trans-Atlantic flight may explain the biogeography of some locust species.

Species 
The Orthoptera Species File lists:

Schistocerca albolineata (Thomas, 1875) – white-lined bird grasshopper
Schistocerca alutacea (Harris, 1841) - leather-colored bird grasshopper
Schistocerca americana (Drury, 1773) - American bird grasshopper - type species
Schistocerca ceratiola Hubbell & Walker, 1928
Schistocerca beckeri Dirsh, 1974
Schistocerca bivittata (Stål, 1873)
Schistocerca braziliensis Dirsh, 1974
Schistocerca brevis Rehn, 1913
Schistocerca camerata Scudder, 1899
Schistocerca cancellata (Serville, 1838) – South American locust
Schistocerca carneipes (Serville, 1838)
Schistocerca caribbeana Dirsh, 1974
Schistocerca centralis Dirsh, 1974
Schistocerca ceratiola Hubbell & Walker, 1928 – rosemary grasshopper
Schistocerca cohni Song, 2006
Schistocerca damnifica (Saussure, 1861) – mischievous bird grasshopper
Schistocerca diversipes Hebard, 1923
Schistocerca flavofasciata (De Geer, 1773)
Schistocerca gorgona Dirsh, 1974
Schistocerca gregaria (Forskål, 1775) – desert locust
Schistocerca impleta (Walker, 1870)
Schistocerca interrita Scudder, 1899
Schistocerca lineata Scudder, 1899 – spotted bird grasshopper
Schistocerca literosa (Walker, 1870)  – small painted locust
Schistocerca magnifica Bruner, 1913
Schistocerca matogrosso Dirsh, 1974
Schistocerca melanocera (Stål, 1861) – large painted locust
Schistocerca nitens (Thunberg, 1815) – grey bird grasshopper
Schistocerca obscura (Fabricius, 1798) – obscure bird grasshopper
Schistocerca orinoco Dirsh, 1974
Schistocerca pallens (Thunberg, 1815)
Schistocerca philippina Navás, 1904
Schistocerca piceifrons (Walker, 1870) – Central American locust
Schistocerca quisqueya Rehn & Hebard, 1938
Schistocerca rubiginosa (Harris, 1862) – rusty bird grasshopper
Schistocerca serialis (Thunberg, 1815)
Schistocerca shoshone (Thomas, 1873) – green bird grasshopper
Schistocerca socorro Dirsh, 1974

References

External links

Schistocerca americana on the UF / IFAS Featured Creatures Web site
Schistocerca ceratiola on the UF / IFAS Featured Creatures Web site
Schistocerca Information Site

Acrididae genera
Taxa named by Carl Stål
Cyrtacanthacridinae